Jorge Antonio Padilla Leal (born 6 September 1993) is a Mexican professional footballer who plays as a right-back for Liga MX club Mazatlán.

References

1993 births
Living people
Mexican footballers
Association football defenders
Leones Negros UdeG footballers
Ascenso MX players
Liga Premier de México players
Tercera División de México players
Footballers from Guadalajara, Jalisco